Elections to Hyndburn Borough Council were held on 4 May 2000.  One third of the council was up for election and the Conservative party gained overall control of the council from no overall control. 

After the election, the composition of the council was
Conservative 31
Labour 15
Independent 1

Election result

Ward results

References
2000 Hyndburn election result

2000 English local elections
2000
2000s in Lancashire